Brave is the 2005 album by Contemporary Christian music artist Nichole Nordeman.  A special edition with four bonus acoustic tracks and expanded liner notes was simultaneously released with the standard version. The album debuted at No. 119 on Billboard 200, No. 2 on Top Christian Albums, with 8,000 copies sold in its first week. It has sold 91,000 copies in the United States as of August 2015.

Critical reception

Brave garnered critical acclaim from eight music critics. At Christianity Today, Russ Breimeier calling noting how the album "is musically grounded in familiar modern pop with occasional flourishes of sonic creativity". Founder Tony Cummings of Cross Rhythms writing that on the release she "shows herself to be a fine songwriter and emotionally gripping singer." At CCM Magazine, Christa Farris stating how if the listener gives their time to hear the album "the rewards are many." Johnny Loftus of AllMusic saying that it is "Nordeman's heartfelt delivery makes it an integral part of Brave's inspirational, unfailingly honest, and crisply modern approach to CCM." At Christian Broadcasting Network, Jennifer E. Jones stating that "it doesn’t get much better than this." Kevan Breitinger of About.com calling the album "a stand-out release". At Jesus Freak Hideout, Lauren Summerford proclaiming that "Nordeman doesn't just meet the bar she has raised so high, but actually goes above it with Brave." The Phantom Tollbooth's Michael Dalton affirming this to be "a strong effort".

Track listing 
All songs written by Nichole Nordeman except where noted.

 "Brave" (Jay Joyce, Nordeman) — 4:15
 "What If" — 4:43
 "Someday" — 4:49
 "Real To Me" (Joyce, Nordeman, Jill Tomalty) — 3:47
 "Crimson" — 2:58
 "Hold On" — 5:47
 "Lay It Down" — 3:44
 "No More Chains" — 4:51
 "Gotta Serve Somebody" (Bob Dylan) — 3:59
 "Live" (Joyce, Nordeman) — 4:11
 "We Build" — 5:08

Special edition bonus tracks
 "Brave (acoustic version)" (Joyce, Nordeman) — 4:09
 "What If (acoustic version)" — 4:24
 "Miles" (acoustic recording) — 4:32
 "The Altar" (acoustic recording) — 7:20

Personnel 
 Nichole Nordeman – vocals, acoustic piano 
 Jay Joyce – keyboards, guitars, bass guitar (1–4, 6–11), drum machines, backing vocals (9)
 Giles Reaves – synthesizers, programming, drums, percussion 
 Byron House – double bass (5)

The Nashville String Machine (track 11)

 Rob Mathes – string arrangements 
 Carl Gorodetzky – concertmaster, contractor
 Jack Jezioro – arco bass
 Paul Christopher – cello 
 Anthony LaMarchina – cello 
 Carole Rabinowitz – cello 
 Jim Grosjean – viola 
 Gary Vanosdale – viola 
 Kristin Wilkinson – viola 
 David Angell – violin
 Janet Askey – violin
 David Davidson – violin
 Conni Ellisor – violin
 Cate Myer – violin
 Pamela Sixfin – violin
 Alan Umstead – violin
 Cathy Umstead – violin
 Mary Kathryn Vanosdale – violin

Production

 Brad O'Donnell – executive producer
 Jay Joyce – producer, recording
 Michael Heavens – recording
 Giles Reaves – recording
 Maxi Media Recording Studios, Dallas, Texas – recording studio
 Tragedy Studios, Nashville, Tennessee – recording studio
 Tom Lord-Alge – mixing (1, 4)
 David Leonard – mixing (2, 3, 5–11)
 Mike Paragone – mix assistant (2, 3, 5–11)
 South Beach Studios, Miami Beach, Florida – mixing studio
 East Iris Studios, Nashville, Tennessee – mixing studio
 Bob Ludwig – mastering at Gateway Mastering, Portland, Maine
 Jan Cook – creative direction
 Alexis Goodman – package art direction, design
 Cindy James – photography
 Angela Angel – hair, make-up
 Chad Curry – wardrobe stylist

Charts

References 

Nichole Nordeman albums
2005 albums
Sparrow Records albums